Joel McKinnon Miller (born February 21, 1960) is an American actor who is best known for portraying Don Embry on Big Love and Detective Norm Scully on Brooklyn Nine-Nine.

Life and career
Joel McKinnon Miller was born in Rockford, Minnesota, on February 21, 1960. He took opera singing lessons as a child, and later attended the University of Minnesota Duluth, where he studied theatre and opera. He dropped out in 1983 to attend The Acting Company but returned to his alma mater to finish his degree in theatre with an acting emphasis in 2007.

Prior to Big Love, McKinnon Miller's main television role was that of Lyle Nubbin in three episodes of Las Vegas. Since 1991 he has also appeared as a guest star on several American television series, including Cold Case, Murphy Brown, The Commish, Curb Your Enthusiasm, Pacific Blue, Dharma & Greg, The X Files, ER, Malcolm in the Middle, Roswell, CSI: Crime Scene Investigation, Deadwood, Six Feet Under, Desperate Housewives, Boston Legal, Nip/Tuck, American Horror Story, The Closer, and Everybody Loves Raymond (in which he portrayed George, the custodian, in the episode "The Faux Pas").

McKinnon Miller's biggest film role is in the 2003 award-winning television film Secret Santa. He also played supporting characters in the films The Truman Show, Galaxy Quest, Rush Hour 2 and Men in Black II, and supplied the voice of Bromley in the animated feature The Swan Princess. He was a main cast member throughout the TV series Brooklyn Nine-Nine as Detective Norm Scully.

On December 30, 2018, McKinnon Miller sang the national anthem at the U.S. Bank Stadium. He identified himself as a lifelong Minnesota Vikings fan.

He married Tammy McKinnon in 1984 and has lived in Los Angeles since 1991. He and his wife have two children, Owen and Caitlyn. His daughter Caitlyn is an environmental planner and got married in October 2019.

Filmography

References

External links

American male film actors
American male television actors
Living people
1960 births
Male actors from Duluth, Minnesota
People from Rockford, Minnesota
University of Minnesota Duluth alumni